The Women's Pole Vault event at the 2003 Pan American Games took place on Saturday August 9, 2003. USA's Melissa Mueller set a new Pan Am record with a leap of 4.40 metres.

Medalists

Records

Results

See also
2003 World Championships in Athletics – Women's pole vault
Athletics at the 2004 Summer Olympics – Women's pole vault

Notes

References
Results

Pole Vault, Women
2003
2003 in women's athletics